Riot/Clone was a punk band often associated with the anarcho-punk scene, active from 1979–1983 and then revived in the early 1990s until they split up again in 2005.  The band were originally known as Riot but the name became Riot/Clone after two members of the original lineup wanted the band's name to become Clone.

History
They were formed by Dave Floyd in August 1979. They went through many line-up changes in the first few years, something which contributed greatly to them being almost unheard of outside their native West London. Their first two cassette albums, Musical Destruction (1980) and Crime Pays (1981) were only ever released in very small quantities, and it was only when they finally got the money together to release an EP in April 1982 (There's No Government Like No Government) did they make the jump to a wider audience, the EP completely selling out within three weeks.  A track from that EP, "Death to Humanity", was also included on the compilation album, Punk & Disorderly - Further Charges. All royalties from this release were donated to the ALF, and Riot/Clone had the record company state exactly that on the cover. Two more EPs followed. August 1982 saw the release of "Destroy the Myth of Musical Destruction" and after many unfortunate delays, their third EP, "Blood on Your Hands?", finally came out in January 1984, however the band's line-up had disintegrated a couple of months earlier.

In 1992, Dave Floyd put together a project named "Mad Dog" along with Pete Spence, also a former member of Riot/Clone. The band didn't last long, but due to feedback from the tape release, the Riot/Clone EPs were reissued along with a book detailing the band's history. This in turn led to the opportunity to record a new Riot/Clone album, and the band were reborn.

"Still No Government Like no Government" was released in the summer of 1995. It was a mixture of re-recorded material and some new songs. The CD contained forty tracks in all, and came bundled with a 142-page booklet. 1996 saw the release of this LP on double vinyl, with the original recordings of the EPs added on side four, but without the booklet.

In 1997 they released "To Find a Little Bluebird", clothed in a bizarre cover. The album's music was probably the closest to 'hardcore punk' Riot/Clone ever achieved. The album was loosely themed around a short story that came printed on the lyric sheet of the blue vinyl release, and as a spoken word track on the CD. More line-up changes ensued, delaying further releases, until "Do You Want Fries With That?", an explicit animal rights album with a cover picture of a dead cow's head was released in 2000. 2004 saw the release of the final Riot/Clone EP, "Mad Sheep Disease", on the Californian label Alternative Records.

Since reforming they initially played only a few UK shows, instead engaging in numerous tours of Europe and America. That changed when Gary joined in 2004, and the band were seen far more frequently in the UK over the next year or so. In May 2005, lead singer and founder member, Dave Floyd planned to move to America so the band had to call it a day. The final Riot/Clone show was held at The Robert Inn in Heston, West London on 1 May 2005.

The story was not over though, as they had recorded another album before their demise. "Success" finally saw the light of day in 2007, released through Dr Strange Records in San Francisco. The name of the album is taken from a quote by Winston Churchill, 'Success is the ability to go from one failure to another with no loss of enthusiasm'. As Dave Floyd stated in the booklet that accompanied both the CD and vinyl releases of the album, 'Somehow that seemed appropriate'.

All the band members carried on with new projects: Dave forming the band Wotnot! and all the remaining members of Riot/Clone forming a new band, Refuse/All.

Discography 
Musical Destruction (LP Cassette, Riot/Clone Records 1979)
Crime Pays (LP Cassette, Riot/Clone Records 1981)
There's no Government like No Government (EP, Riot/Clone Records 1982)
"Death to Humanity" on Punk & Disorderly-Further Charges (Compilation LP, Red Cherry Records, 1982)
Destroy the Myth of Musical Destruction (EP, Riot/Clone Records 1982)
Riot/Clone live(Live LP Cassette, Riot/Clone Records 1982)
Blood on Your Hands (EP, Riot/Clone Records 1983)
Dead...But Not Forgotten (Re-issue of EPs with book, Riot/Clone Records 1994)
Still No Government like No Government (CD & 142 page book, Riot/Clone Records 1995/Double LP, Step 1 Records, 1996)
To Find a Little Bluebird (LP, Bomb Factory 1997)
"Taste" & "Wake Up!" on Keep it Angry (Compilation LP, Bomb Factory 1998)
"Chumbawanka" on Bare Faced Hypocrisy Sells Records (Compilation EP Ruptured Ambitions 1998)
"One Less Parasite" on Aftermath-Profane Existence Benefit Album (Compilation LP, Profane Existence 1999)
Do You Want Fries with That? (CD, Upstart Productions/LP, Tribal War Records, 2000)
"One Struggle, One Fight" on Direct Action Animal Rights Compilation (Compilation LP, 2002)
"Cows with Guns" on Direct Action Arkangel (Compilation LP, 2004)
Mad Sheep Disease (EP, Alternative Records, 2004)
Success (Dr. Strange, 2007)

External links 
2004 Interview with Dave Floyd
The Official Riot/Clone Website
Wotnot!'s (Dave Floyd) Website
Refuse/All Website

Anarcho-punk groups
English punk rock groups